Khastakhumār and Bībīnagār or Xasteh Xomār is an Afghan folktale. Both refer to a marriage between a human woman and an enchanted prince in snake form, and follow the internationally known narrative structure of "The Search for the Lost Husband".

Summary

First version
A version of the tale, titled Khastakhumār and Bībīnagār, was collected by professor Hafizullah Baghban in 1967, from a fifty-year-old farmer named Yar Muhammad. In this tale, an old kharkash ('thorn-seller', 'thorn-gatherer'), while gathering thorn bushes to sell, meets a black snake who asks for the man's youngest daughter's hand in marriage. He marries the maiden as a snake, but takes off his snake skin (his jild, a cover or disguise) and appears as a man in their bridal bed. The wife's two stepsisters, seeing the man and becoming jealous, convince her to ask about burning his jild skin. He questions his wife's interest in the matter, but answers her: it can be burned with garlic and onion skins. The stepsisters burn the jild, the man becomes a green pigeon and tells his wife she must wear down seven pairs of iron clothes, seven pairs of iron shoes and seven canes, all the way to the west, then she'll find him, and vanishes.

She begins her wanderings, and passes by a caravan of camels, a flock of sheep, a herd of cows, and a herd of donkeys - all belonging to her husband Khastakhumar. She arrives at a spring and asks for a drink of water, but a woman (concubine) says she is in a hurry and refuses her plight. Bibinagar curses the water the other is carrying to become pus and blood, which she gives to her master. The third time, the servant returns to fetch water, gives it to Bibinagar, and returns to her master. When the concubine pours down the water on her master's hands, a ring drops out of the jug that the master recognizes as Bibinagar's. Khastakhumar takes her in as a servant in his mother's house. His mother tries to get rid of her, by setting her to go to her sister to ask for khamirturush (a sourdough ball used to prepare bread).

Before she goes, Khastakhumar intercepts her and teaches her to reach his aunt: she is to compliment a river of pus by saying it contains butter; compliment a river of blood by saying it contains juice; compliment a crooked tree; open his aunt's shut gate and shut her open one; anf give the correct fodder to animals (bone to a dog and a straw to a donkey). The woman visits the witch, gets the khamirturush and escapes. The aunt commands the dog, the donkey, the gates, the tree and the rivers of pus and blood to stop Bibinegar, but the human woman leaves unscathed.

Next, Khastakhumar's mother forces Bibinagar to hold candles during Khastakhumar's marriage to his aunt's daughter: Khastakhumar's mother wraps cotton around her fingers and lights them up. Suffering their burning, Bibinagar cries out to Khastakhumar her fingers are burning, and he, in return, says his heart and soul are the ones that are burning. After his wedding to his cousein, Khastakhumar asks Bibinagar to boil water. His new wife takes the boiled water to the tushnuk (a sort of washroom), pours it on her head and dies.

The couple prepares to escape from Khastakhumar's family and takes with them a dozen needles, water in a sheepskin, a dozen juwalduz (large sewing needles), salt and glass. As his family pursues them, the couple tries to hinder the chase by throwing objects behind them: first the juwaldaz, then the needles, the salt, the glass and finally the water to create a river between them. At the other side of the river, Khastakhumar's family asks how they crossed the stream. Bibinagar explains she crossed by pocketing some rocks and jumping. His family follows the false instructions and sink to the bottom. The couple wait until black blood foams at the river surface to confirm his family's demise. After they ascertain their victory, they go back to his father-in-law's house and remarry.

Second version
A second version of the tale was collected by American folklorist Margaret Mills from a woman named MZ, in the Dari language, titled Xasteh Xomār. In her version, a poor, old thorn-gatherer, while in the fields, lifts a stone and finds a hidden cache of flour. Thinking it is a divine blessing, he takes some and brings it home. When he returns, he sees a snake on top of the trapdoor, who explains it is the owner of the flour and demands one of the man's daughters in return. He tells the situation to his three daughters, but only the youngest accepts to be delivered to the snake.

She sits on a camel to be taken to her snake husband. A handsome man greets her and takes her to an underground palace. He explains that he wears a snake skin, but is otherwise human. He gives her free rein on all his properties.

Some time later, her sisters want to visit her, and her elder gets curious about the snake skin. She prompts the youngest to ask her husband about it later that night. She does and is reproached by her husband, warning her that if the skin is burnt, it may lead to disgrace for both of them. He says her question is foolish, but answers that it can be burnt with onion and garlic skins.

The girl naïvely tells her sisters about it the next time they visit. Her sisters heat up the oven and throw the snakeskin inside, just as Xasteh Xomar appears to try to stop them. As the skin burns, the grand palace and everything within it vanish, leaving only the girls, and a betrayed Xasteh Xomar. He tells his wife that, if she ever wants to see him again, she must head westwards, wearing seven pairs of iron shoes and seven iron canes, but warns her that his own family is entirely made of divs that may devour her.

Later, the girl goes after him with the needed garments. She passes by a herd of camels, a herd of cows, a herd of sheep and a herd of goats - all the brideprice of Bibi Negar. She finally stops by her husband's place. While she rests, she sees a servant girl come out of the building to fetch some water. She begs the girl to drink some, but the servant refuses and tells her the water is for her master. The girl curses the water to become blood, then pus, and by the third time the servant goes to the fountain, she finally gives the girl a drink of water. She discreetly lets her ring inside the jug. When the servant takes the jug to Xasteh Xomar, he recognizes the ring and brings the girl home. 

Xasteh Xomar is happy to see his human wife, but reminds her of the warning about his family. So he turns her into a needle to hide her presence from the divs. However, his div mother notices the human smell on him and wants her son to reveal the human he is hiding. Xasteh Xomar makes her promise not to harm his human wife (who he passes off as a servant). The div mother still forces her to do chores for them: to sweep the floor and sprinkle water over it; to take a black mat and wash it white, and to wash it back to black. Xasteh Xomār invokes magic help in the name of prophet Solomon and helps his wife in her tasks.

Thirdly, the div mother sends the girl to go to her sister's house and bring a comb, a mirror and scissors. Xasteh Xomar advises her to compliment everything on its way, no matter if ugly or repulsive; to give the correct food for the dog and the camel; to get the objects and run away as fast as she can. She does as instructed and returns to the div mother's house with the requested items.

Finally, the div mother prepares the wedding of Xasteh Xomar with his cousin, Bibi Negar. His div mother wraps cotton around the human girl's fingers, butters them with ghee, lights the improvised candles and forces her to illuminate the wedding procession. Xasteh Xomar's human wife cries out that her fingers are burning, but Xasteh Xomar himself is also suffering with his mother's ploy. When the ceremony ends, Xasteh Xomar insists that the servant girl sleeps by the door, in case he and his new wife need something.

That night, Xasteh Xomar heats up a cauldron of cooking fat, takes his new wife and dumps her inside the cooking pot. He at last awakens his human wife, takes some objects from the house and both escape.

The next morning, his div family notices that he has not awakened yet, nor has his bride. They notice that the bride Bibi Negar has been cooked like a meal, and decide to go after the runaway couple. His aunt and mother follow them in a cloud of smoke. Xasteh Xomar notices their approach and throws objects to deter them, invoking the name of prophet Solomon to work the magic. The last object creates a lake. Xasteh Xomar deceives his family by saying that he crossed the lake by carrying a mountain on each shoulder and a millstone around their neck. His relatives repeat the action and sink to the bottom of the lake, never to return.

Xasteh Xomar and his human wife return to their palace.

Mills states that Xasteh Xomār is a "very popular Afghan variant" of tale type ATU 425. In a previous article, she claims to have collected 11 performances (ca. 1974-1976). In a later work, she noted to have recorded 14 performances in Herat. In 13 of them, the magical bridegroom appears as a snake. Some versions may be translated as Khasta Khamarah, Khasta Khamorah or The Snake Man and the Human Brick.

Analysis

Tale type
Scholars relate the story to the ancient Graeco-Roman myth of Cupid and Psyche and classify both versions as type ATU 425, "The Search for the Lost Husband", in the Aarne-Thompson-Uther Index. In this type, the heroine marries an enchanted animal who is a prince in disguise, loses him due to her own actions, and goes on a arduous quest to get him back. In both Afghan tales, the heroine must wear down seven pairs of iron shoes and walk with an iron cane.

In his monograph about Cupid and Psyche (AaTh 425) and related types, Swedish scholar  believed that his type A (Cupid and Psyche) appeared to be "the main tale type of Aa 425" in Persia and in India.

German scholar  listed the tale Margaret Mills collected as an Afghan parallel to the Iranian tales he classified under type AaTh 425B, Der Tierbräutigam: Die böse Zauberin ("The Animal Bridegroom: The Evil Sorceress").

Motifs
These tales contain the motif of dropping a ring for identification in a glass of water (motif H94.4), instead of into a glass of wine, as it is described in Stith Thompson's Motif-Index of Folk-Literature. Scholars point out that this substitution occurs in Afghan and Muslim variants due to religious influence of Islam.

Margaret Mills translates Bibī Negār as "Lady Beauty" or "Lady Idol".

Variants

Iran
Folklorist Margaret Mills disagrees with Jan-Öjvind's assessment in regards to the distribution of variants of the tale type in Persian language. She stated that "in [her] experience" the tale was one of the "most performed" in that language. A similar observation was given by professor : he listed 7 versions of a similar Iranian variant, some found, for instance, in Dezful and Kashmar.

A variant from Karman, Persia, was collected by Emily Lorimer and David Lockhart Robertson Lorimer, with the name The Snake Prince Sleepy-Head, later translated into Italian as Il principe serpente and Mir Mast, il Principe Serpente. and into German as Der Schlangenprinz. In this tale, a king and a vizir promise to marry their children to each other. The king's wife gives birth to a black serpent named Mir Mast or Khumar (Mīz Mast o Khumār, or "Prince Sleepy-Head"), and the vizir's wife to a girl they name Mèr-Nigā ("Eye of Grace"). They marry. One night, the vizir's daughter discovers her husband is a handsome prince and asks him how to get rid of his snakeskin. The prince tells her she must burn the shed snakeskin in a special pyre, but warns her that if she does that, she will never see him again. She decides to burn the snakeskin and he curses her to never see him again until she wears down seven pairs of iron shoes. After she accomplishes the task, Mer Niga arrives at another kingdom, where she learns from a waterbearer that the castle belongs to Mir Mast's bride-to-be. Mer Niga drops her engagement ring on the waterbearer's jar she delivers to Mir Mast and the prince notices his former wife is in the castle. They meet and he gives her some strands of his hair to help her in case she needs. Mir Mast convinces his false bride to hire Mer Niga as her maid and his aunt soon sends her on difficult tasks: she receives a pearl-encrusted sweeping broom that she must use and not drop a single pearl; to sprinkle the floor with a colander; to take a casket full of insects to "Such and Such a place". Still on the way, Mer Niga opens the casket and hordes of insects crawl on her. Her husband appears, collects the insects and locks them up in the box again. He then advises his wife on how to proceed: she shall give a bone to a dog and straw to a horse; open a closed door and shut an open one; compliment a hollow full of dirt and blood and drop the casket there. At last, the prince's aunt forces Mer Niga to hold candles on her fingers to illuminate her husband's bridal procession. After the wedding, Mer Niga and the Snake Prince escape from his aunt's house and take some objects with them. His aunt and uncle pursue them, but the couple throw some objects behind them (tale type ATU 313, "The Magic Flight"), with Miz Mast o Khumār invoking God's and the Prophet Sulémān's help, to hinder their pursuers. German scholar  classified this tale as type AaTh 425B, Der Tierbräutigam: Die böse Zauberin ("The Animal Bridegroom: The Evil Sorceress").

In another tale translated by Osmanov as "Мирза Масту-Хумар и Биби-Мехрнегар" ("Mirza Mastu-Khumar and Bibi-Mehrnegar"), a dervish gives a pomegranate to a shah's wife and an apple to the vizir's, as a birthing implement to cure their barrenness. The vizir's wife gives birth to a daughter they call Bibi-Mehrnegar, and the shah's to a black snake Mirza Mastu-Khumar. They arrange for a marriage between their children. Mirza Mastu-Khumar takes off his snake skin at night and shows his human form to his wife. At her father-in-law's insistence, she burns the snake skin and the man tells her she must wear down seven pairs of iron shoes on her way back to him. During her journey, she meets seven divs. Her last stop is by a spring, where she begs for a drink of water. She puts her ring inside the jug that is taken to her husband. Mirza Mastu-Khumar recognizes the ring, brings Bibi-Mehernegar to his house as a servant and makes his div family promise not to harm her. His aunt forces the girl to do chores around the house: to sweep the floor with a beaded broom and not to lose any bead, and to water the yard with a sieve. Lastly, the div asks her to take a "dancing box" to the div's brother and to bring another box from him. On the way, she opens the div's box and dancers escape from the box. She uses a tuft of hair to summon her husband, who helps her to close the box. He also warns her to go to the div's brother's house, open the closed doors and close the opened ones, give hay to a horse and a bone to a dog, compliment everything on the way, get the box and escape from there as quick as she can. She follows his instructions to the letter. Some time later, his family forces Mirza Mastu-Khumar to marry another woman, and places Bibi-Mehrnegar as a torchbearer, by placing ten candles on her fingers. That night, Mirza Mastu-Khumar kills his new bride and escapes with his true wife. His aunt follows them and they throw objects behind them to create magical obstacles. Professor Osmanov stated that this tale was previously published in "Пеяме ноу" ("Peyame Nou"), a Soviet-Iranian cultural journal.

In another Iranian variant, published by professor Osmanov with the title "Змеиный Царь" ("The Serpent Tsar"), a poor woodcutter is approached by a serpent, who asks him one of his daughter's hands in marriage. Only the youngest, named Mehrnegar, attends the serpent's request. The serpent comes to take her as an animal, but takes off its skin and becomes a handsome man, to her sisters's consternation and jealousy. Mehrnegar rejects the man at first, but he explains he is the serpent, born of a peri, and both leave for their new home. One day, Mehrnegar is visited by her sisters, who push her to ask her husband about the snakeskin. He answers her that the skin can be burnt in a bonfire with onion and garlic peels. The sisters overhear their conversation and, while the couple is asleep, they toss the skin in the fire. The Serpent Tsar wakes up and admonishes his wife. Mehrnegar begs him to forgive her, but he says he will become two pigeons she must try to capture; otherwise, Mehrnegar must wear a pair of iron shoes and walk with an iron cane until she finds a snake burrow. The girl fails in getting the birds, which escape. Mehrnegar dresses just as her husband instructed and goes on a journey; she passes by a herd of camels and a splendid garden with fruits, flowers and chirping birds - all belonging to her husband. She reaches a spring near a snake burrow and sees a servant girl coming to fetch water. She asks for a drink. The servant refuses and Mehrnegar curses the water to become pus and blood. The servant takes the water to her master, the Serpent Tsar, who sends the servant to the fountain to get clean water again. Mehrnegar gets her drink, and puts her ring on the jug. When the Serpent Tsar washes his hands with the water jug, he notices the ring. He goes back to the spring and brings his wife home. He explains to Mehrnegar that his mother is preparing his wedding to his cousin, and decides to protect his true wife by telling everyone she is an orphan in need of a job. The Serpent Tsar's mother forces Mehrnegar to give water to serpents with a sieve, and to carry a letter to her sister and trade it for scissors. The Serpent Tsar instructs his wife to compliment the objects on the way and to feed correctly the horse and the dog, get the scissors and leave as quick as possible. Finally, the Serpent Tsar's Mother places burning candles on Mehrnegar's hands, telling her to hold them until they go out. The Serpent Tsar and the false bride are led into their chambers, as Mehrnegar mourns her fate in the stables. Suddenly, her husband appears and convinces her to escape with him, saying he killed his second wife. Mehrnegar and the Serpent Tsar escape. His mother and family notice his absence and go after them. The couple escape by throwing needles, a handful of salt and a waterskin, which transform into a forest, a mountain and a lake, to hinder the pursuit.

Another variant was published in Spanish language with the title Bibi Negar, la Amada Buena, y Heydar Mar, el marido serpiente ("Bibi Negar, the good spouse, and Heydar Mar, the serpent husband"). Its collectors classified the tale as types 312A (man promises daughter to animal under threat of death), 425A (marriage to animal husband, his subsequent disappearance and his wife's search) and 428 (girl as servant to an ogre and assigned dangerous tasks).

Turkmenistan
Turkologist  published and translated a Turkmen tale titled "Хутды Хумар" ("Chutdy Chumar"). In this tale, a poor wood-seller gathers some firewood to sell, when a snake appears and asks the old man for one of his daughters in marriage. The old man returns home and explains the situation to his three daughters, but only the youngest, named Dschemal, accepts to be the snake's bride. She waits by the door when a camel and two snakes come to take her to her betrothed. She waits in the bedroom for the snake and it comes, takes off its skin and becomes a human youth. The next morning, he reveals his name is Chutdy Chumar, and wears the snakeskin again. Ten days pass, and her family visits Dschemal. She tells her sisters about the snake husband and they suggest she burns the skin so he becomes human for good. The girl decides to follow through the suggestion and burns it. Chutdy Chumar laments the fact, turns into a pigeon and says she can only find him if she wears down a pair of irons shoes and an iron cane, then vanishes. The girl commissions such garments and begins her journey. She passes by a herd of camels, of cows, of sheep and of horses - all belonging to her husband, and with a small fire burning on top of them. The shepherds explain that the animals are burning just as their master has had his snakeskin burnt by his wife. After walking for quite some time, she stops by a tree to rest and notices her shoes have holes in it. She realizes she must be close. Meanwhile, Chutdy Chumar has been betrothed to his aunt's daughter, who leaves the house to fetch water for them and sees Dschemal. She tells the man there is a girl outside and he takes her in. His mother, a Div-woman, forces Dschemal on some tasks: to fetch water using a sieve, to fill two sacks with feathers of white doves, to bleach a piece of black cloth and to wash it black again, and to turn a bag of peas into wheat. Chutdy Chumar helps her in all tasks. At last, the Div-mother sends her to her sister to get a comb for her (a trap set to kill the maiden). Her husband advises her on how to procceed: compliment a crooked tree and a dirty river, open a closed door and shut an open one, give a horse and a camel their respective food, get the comb and escape. She returns with the comb just in time for the Div-mother's last trap: she is to be set on fire, while Chutdy Chumar enters the water. He saves Dschemal by replacing her for his bride, as the woman begins to burn herself and the house. The pair escapes. His Div-mother notices the bride has been burnt and goes after them, and they change into different things to elude her: a melon and a seller, a windmill and a miller, a sheep and a shepherd. In the last transformation: Chutdy Chumar creates a river, then transforms Dschemal into a rosebush in the middle of the river and himself into a nightingale. His mother cannot cross the river and ceases her pursuit. The pair returns to her father and live happily ever after. Reichl classified the tale as belonging to the cycle of ATU 425A, "Animal as Bridegroom" and ATU 425B, "The Witch's Tasks".

See also
The King of Love
Ulv Kongesøn (Prince Wolf)
The Golden Root
The Horse-Devil and the Witch
Tulisa, the Wood-Cutter's Daughter
Habrmani (Armenian folk tale)
 Yasmin and the Serpent Prince
Baemsillang (The Serpent Husband)
Amewakahiko soshi

Footnotes

References 

Fictional princes
Male characters in fairy tales
Female characters in fairy tales
Fictional snakes
Fiction about shapeshifting
Afghan culture
Afghan literature
ATU 400-459